Conor Patrick McGinn (born 31 July 1984) is a British politician serving as Member of Parliament (MP) for St Helens North since 2015. He was the Labour Party Deputy National Campaign Coordinator from June 2021 and Shadow Minister without Portfolio from December 2021 until September 2022. He was suspended by the party in December 2022 after a unspecified complaint was lodged against him.

Early life
McGinn was born in Camlough, near Newry, County Armagh, Northern Ireland, and brought up in the nearby village of Bessbrook. The village was highly militarised during The Troubles. His mother was an NHS clerical officer, and his father was a Sinn Féin councillor.

McGinn went to St Paul's High School, Bessbrook. Before going to university, he worked for the African National Congress in South Africa on a fellowship for two months. He studied at Goldsmiths, University of London, but did not initially complete his degree, remaining in London working for a mental health charity for Irish immigrants, Immigrant Counselling and Psychotherapy, and later for the Irish Council for Prisoners Overseas. He later completed his history, politics and Irish studies degree part-time at London Metropolitan University.

Political career
McGinn was chair of the Young Fabians from 2006 to 2007, and has been vice-chair of Young Labour. He stood to be a councillor on Islington London Borough Council in 2006 and 2010 without success. He has been on the executive of the Fabian Society and until 2012 was chair of the Labour Party Irish Society. In 2011 he represented the socialist societies on the Labour Party National Executive Committee.

He worked as a public affairs and government relations consultant, before becoming an advisor to shadow Northern Ireland Secretary Vernon Coaker in 2011, and continued to work for Coaker when he became shadow defence secretary.

Post election, he was appointed to the Defence Select Committee and as an Opposition Whip.

McGinn was briefly a communist in his youth, but is now regarded as being on the right of the Labour Party. He is listed as a Parliamentary supporter of both the Labour Friends of Israel and Labour Friends of Palestine & the Middle East.  McGinn supported Andy Burnham's bid for the leadership of the Labour Party in 2015. McGinn nominated Owen Smith in the 2016 leadership election.

Following the October 2016 Shadow Cabinet reshuffle, and the replacement of Dame Rosie Winterton as Chief Whip, McGinn resigned as a whip.

He served on the Foreign Affairs Committee and has also been a delegate to the Parliamentary Assembly of the Council of Europe. He has chaired the All-Party Parliamentary Group (APPG) on Ireland and the Irish in Britain, and is co-chair of the APPG on Horseracing. He has previously held this position for the APPGs on Coalfield Communities, and Darts. McGinn is Honorary Secretary to the APPG on Music, an executive committee member of the British-American Parliamentary Group, as well as a Member of the British-Irish Parliamentary Assembly.

McGinn supported the campaign for Helen's Law, working with Marie McCourt to successfully introduce a Private Members Bill and successfully getting the Government to commit to introducing tougher penalties for murderers who refuse to reveal the location of their victims’ remains.

He campaigned and moved the successful House of Commons amendment to change the law to extend equal marriage for LGBT people to Northern Ireland. This led to him being awarded the Pink News Politician of the Year in 2018.

In 2016, he was involved in a Twitter spat, which became a media story, with Labour leader Jeremy Corbyn, in which McGinn claimed that Corbyn "said that he intended to ring my father", a former Sinn Féin councillor. Corbyn's spokesman said the claim was "untrue". 

On 9 April 2020, McGinn was appointed as Shadow Minister for Security. In June 2021, he was appointed as Labour's deputy national campaign coordinator. In December 2021, he was appointed Shadow Minister without Portfolio shadowing Oliver Dowden. In December 2022 he was suspended by the party pending an investigation of an unspecified complaint. McGinn denies wrongdoing.

Personal life
McGinn lives in Earlestown, Newton-le-Willows. He is a Roman Catholic. He married Kate Groucutt about 2009, and has a son and a daughter. McGinn holds both Irish and British citizenship.

References

External links
 
 St Paul's Bessbrook Senior Prizegiving 2013 - Conor McGinn (video)

|-

|-

1984 births
Living people
People from Bessbrook
Labour Party (UK) MPs for English constituencies
Labour Friends of Israel
Labour Friends of Palestine and the Middle East
People educated at St Paul's High School, Bessbrook
Alumni of Goldsmiths, University of London
Alumni of London Metropolitan University
Irish expatriates in South Africa
Members of the Fabian Society
People from County Armagh
UK MPs 2015–2017
UK MPs 2017–2019
UK MPs 2019–present
English Roman Catholics
Independent members of the House of Commons of the United Kingdom